Lille Lørdag was a Norwegian sketch comedy television program that ran on the Norwegian state channel NRK from 1995 till 1996.
The show was significant in launching the careers of comedians Harald Eia and Bård Tufte Johansen.
The name reflects the fact it was aired on Wednesday, or "Little Saturday" in the Scandinavian week.

References 

Norwegian comedy television series
NRK original programming